Garth Brooks is an American country singer-songwriter. From his first concert series to his current record-breaking worldwide tour, Brooks has changed the face of performing from a country music perspective, adding high energy and pyrotechnics to depict a hard rock-country crossover. Since his first tour began in 1991, Brooks has performed in a variety of concert settings, including a world tour, residencies, and benefit concerts.

Concert tours

Concert residencies

Promotional tours

Benefit concerts

Other concerts

References

External links
Garth Brooks' official website

 
B